XHSRD-FM/XESRD-AM is an AM-FM regional Mexican radio station that serves the state of Durango. It is owned by Grupo Garza Limón and carries its La Tremenda Regional Mexican format.

History
XESRD received its concession on August 21, 1986. Initially owned by Ricardo León Garza Limón (who founded Grupo Garza Limón), XESRD broadcast on 560 kHz with 5,000 watts during the day and 250 watts at night.

XESRD migrated to FM in 2011 as XHSRD-FM, but it was required to maintain its AM station, as communities could lose radio service were the AM station to go off the air. The FM transmitter is located atop Cerro China.

External links

References

Regional Mexican radio stations
Radio stations in Durango
Radio stations in Mexico with continuity obligations